The Tory Campaign for Homosexual Equality (TORCHE) was a British LGBT conservative organization.

In 1975, it was founded as the Conservative Group for Homosexual Equality (CGHE), also called GayCon, by Peter Walter Campbell. The CGHE was a voluntary organization that lobbied the Conservative Party opinion in favour of gay rights and to provide a political balance within the gay rights movement. The group was revived in 1980, and a constitution drawn up and adopted on 28 March 1981, establishing an elected Executive Committee to oversee the running of the group. In 1991, the CGHE reconstituted at the Conservative Party Conference and renamed the Tory Campaign for Homosexual Equality. The organization would remain active until 2004, when it disbanded.

See also

Campaign for Homosexual Equality
List of organisations associated with the British Conservative Party
List of LGBT-related organisations
LGBT rights in the United Kingdom

References

1975 establishments in the United Kingdom
2004 disestablishments in the United Kingdom
LGBT affiliate organizations of political parties
LGBT conservatism
LGBT political advocacy groups in the United Kingdom
Organisations associated with the Conservative Party (UK)
Organizations established in 1975
Organizations disestablished in 2004